Wellesley C. Bailey (1846–1937) was the founder of international charity The Leprosy Mission. In India, in the 1860s he witnessed the severe consequences of the disease and vowed to make caring for those struggling with leprosy his life work. The Mission he established all those years ago is still active today.

Early life
Wellesley Bailey was born in Ireland in 1846. He grew up in Abbeyleix, Queens County where his father was an estate manager for the Cosby family. The Baileys earned enough to send Wellesley and his three brothers to boarding school at Kilkenny College.

Ireland, in the 1840s and '50s, was a tough environment to grow up in – the country was immersed in the Great Famine. Over one million people emigrated from Ireland during the late 1840s. North America and the colonies were the favoured destinations of those who could afford to leave.

It is not surprising then that Wellesley himself dreamed of finding a new, more promising life, in distant lands. In 1866 he set out to find his fortune in the goldfields of Australia.

Three years later he returned to Dublin, his ambitions unfulfilled. But it wasn't long before he was setting sail again. One of his brothers was serving in the police force in India and invited Wellesley to join him. Always on the look out for a challenge, Wellesley departed for Faizabad, North East India, in 1869.

Wellesley Bailey's Christian faith
Although Wellesley Bailey had gone to a Church of Ireland church as a child, he'd never particularly taken the Christian faith seriously. That was until he found himself at the start of a voyage that was to take him a long way from home. In Gravesend, fog delayed the departure of his ship bound for Australia. Remembering his childhood girlfriend's request to him before he left to attend church whenever he could, he stopped by one Sunday at Gravesend Parish church. There, he says he had a sense of God's presence in a way he'd never known before and he committed his life to Christ.

First visit to India
For the very first time, When Wellesley reached India in 1869, his brother had been moved to the north west of the country and he found himself alone in a strange land. He put aside his original intention to join the police and instead focused his energies on learning Hindi.

He lodged with an old German Lutheran missionary who was able to teach him the local language. At this time he began to feel that God was calling him to missionary work. So he applied to work with the American Presbyterian Mission. They accepted him and sent him as a teacher to one of their schools in Ambala in the state of Punjab, north India.

The leader of the American Mission in Ambala was Dr. J.H. Morrison. Wellesley began to hear from his colleagues about how Dr. Morrison 'looked after some beggars who were lepers'. Wellesley had no idea what this meant. He had only heard about leprosy and 'lepers' from Bible stories.

One day Dr Morrison invited him to visit the beggars' huts with him. Wellesley was quite shocked by what he saw. Many of them had clawed hands, some were blind, some had disfigured faces.

Afterwards, Bailey wrote:

'I almost shuddered, yet I was at the same time fascinated, and I felt that if there was ever a Christlike work in the world it was to go amongst these poor sufferers and bring them the consolation of the gospel.'

All the while Bailey had been in India, he had been corresponding with the childhood girlfriend, Alice Grahame, who'd encouraged him to go to church. Wellesley proposed in one letter and they became engaged. In 1870 Alice sailed to India and that year they were married in Bombay Cathedral.

The dry heat of the Punjab had a bad effect on Alice's health. Two years after she arrived it was clear that she would not be able to maintain a good quality of life in India, and so Wellesley resigned from the American Mission and together they returned to Ireland.

The 'Mission to Lepers' is born
Having to return to Ireland was a deep disappointment for Wellesley. But it provided him with plenty of opportunities to talk to people about the problems faced by those with leprosy in India.

In 1874 friends of Wellesley and Alice, the Pim sisters, invited them to stay with them in Dublin. The sisters then invited some of their friends over and asked Wellesley to describe his work with leprosy-affected people. The stories that Wellesley told captured the imagination; very little had ever been communicated before to people in the West about leprosy.

A larger venue than the Pims' sisters living room was found and Wellesley talked about his work to a wider audience. He explained to people about some of the financial needs: 'For as little as £5 an adult leper can be cared for in an asylum, and a child for much less than that.'

Wellesley's talks were also produced in booklet form, entitled Lepers in India. It soon sold out and had to be reprinted. The Pim sisters hesitantly agreed to try and raise £30 a year for leprosy work in India.

Alice's health had significantly improved and they were able to return to India in 1875.  Wellesley had been appointed a lay-missionary with the Church of Scotland. Initially, he was preaching and then in his spare time doing whatever he could for leprosy sufferers, using some of the funds sent over to India by the Pim sisters to build shelters. His divided loyalties caused tension between Bailey and the Scottish Mission who wanted him to focus more on his teaching and preaching work. In 1878 he was given permission to take a month's leave and he returned to Ireland.

Once Wellesley was back in his home country The Mission to Lepers became properly formalised.  Bailey reported that they were caring for about 100 leprosy-affected people, mostly in north India. Charlotte Pim informed the new committee that they were raising about £900 a year. Wellesley Bailey was appointed the first secretary and treasurer to work from India.

The Baileys and their three children went back to India in 1879. At this stage, Wellesley was still trying to combine his work for the Church of Scotland Mission with his unpaid work as secretary for the Mission to Lepers.

Alice's health again became fragile. In 1882, the Scottish Mission board ordered them home and took Wellesley off their missionary lists. Later that year the Baileys moved to Edinburgh where Wellesley took up position as secretary of a charity that worked with women in India. Still he continued his work with the Mission to Lepers. As the income continued to increase, it became possible to extend the work further.

In 1886, Wellesley Bailey gave up his post with the Scottish charity and was appointed full-time secretary of The Mission to Lepers in India. That same year, Wellesley and Alice set off for a tour of India to see for themselves the vast needs of those with leprosy throughout the whole country. They did not return until the spring of 1887.

The growth of the Mission
Wellesley's tour of India had highlighted to him how great the need for The Mission to Lepers work was. He had witnessed other missionaries' attempts to care for those with leprosy, often without the support of their Mission organisation. When he visited projects, Bailey was seen as the expert and also a source of financial support. Where possible, he provided the funds necessary to keep the asylums or shelters going. Steadily, income to the Mission to Lepers grew. Three 'auxiliaries', or fundraising bases, sprung up in England – in Brighton, Cheltenham and Bolton.

Wellesley and Alice returned to Scotland in 1887 and Wellesley began to concentrate on growing the Mission. Letters were arriving from different centres in India asking for support for leprosy work.
Up until this point, Wellesley had focused solely on India. But then came a letter from Mandalay in Burma asking for help. The Mission to Lepers responded by providing funds for the building of a home for those with leprosy. By 1891, China was added to the list of countries that The Mission to Lepers was working in.

In the last decade of the century the Baileys were travelling East and West. In 1892 Wellesley toured the US and Canada speaking about his work with leprosy sufferers.

Wellesley Bailey was becoming a key figure in Mission circles, and his knowledge and experience of leprosy work was sought after. In 1893 he was invited to Chicago to speak at the World Congress of Missions.

In 1906 Wellesley Bailey set off again for a tour of the East.

Then in 1913 Wellesley embarked on what was to be his last voyage to visit the work that The Mission to Lepers had started. Wellesely and Alice Bailey journeyed through China, then on to New Zealand, Australia, the Philippines, Japan, Korea, back to China and then on to Malaysia, Singapore and India. During this tour he gave over 150 addresses, met with many government officials and visited leprosy homes everywhere.

The situation they returned to in Scotland, and Europe, was difficult to bear. The workload for the Mission increased significantly. They lost a couple of key members of staff within a short space of time. Then war broke out in 1914 and one of Bailey's sons, Dermot, was killed in the fighting.

Retirement
In 1917, at the age of 71, Wellesley Bailey made the decision to retire from his work with the Mission. He had spent the best part of 50 years dedicated to serving those with leprosy. By the time of his retirement, The Mission to Lepers was working with over 14,000 leprosy-affected people in 12 countries.

His granddaughter later wrote about him: 'He was not a saint, nor even a clever man... But I do not ever remember hearing from him an ungenerous remark, or seeing him angry apart from minor irritations. His great gift was single-mindedness, and a simplicity that perhaps could not see the difficulties which a more sophisticated mind might see.'

Wellesley Bailey died in 1937, aged 91.

Wellesley Bailey's impact on leprosy work
Before the birth of the Mission to Lepers, support for leprosy work was not very high on people's agendas. Wellesley Bailey saw a huge need when he first visited the leprosy huts in Ambala and set about raising awareness of the plight of those with leprosy, which subsequently raised financial support allowing the work to grow and continue.

The Leprosy Mission exists to this day.

In one of his last speeches before his retirement, Wellesley said: 'The Mission has been born and cradled in prayer. It has been brought up on prayer; it has been nourished on prayer; and prayer has been at the bottom of its success since the first moments of its life.'

References

External links
 The Leprosy Mission International

1937 deaths
1846 births
Irish Christian missionaries
People educated at Kilkenny College
Anglican missionaries in India
Christian medical missionaries
Irish expatriates in India
Irish evangelicals
Evangelical Anglicans